Events from the year 1449 in Ireland.

Incumbent
Lord: Henry VI

Events
Richard Duke of York arrives in Ireland as Lord Lieutenant of Ireland, leading to the submission of many Irish chiefs and English rebels.

Births
October 21 –  George Plantagenet, 1st Duke of Clarence, third son of Richard Plantagenet, 3rd Duke of York (d. 1478)

References

 
1440s in Ireland
Ireland
Years of the 15th century in Ireland